Hotchkiss Methodist Episcopal Church (Hotchkiss United Methodist Church ; Hotchkiss Community United Methodist Church) is a historic church at 285 N. 2nd Street in Hotchkiss, Colorado. It was built in 1929 and was added to the National Register of Historic Places in 2009.

It is Craftsman in style, and includes local basalt rock.

The church was founded in 1893 and its first building was built in 1898.

References

Methodist churches in Colorado
Churches on the National Register of Historic Places in Colorado
Churches completed in 1929
Buildings and structures in Delta County, Colorado
National Register of Historic Places in Delta County, Colorado